The Mumbai cricket team is a cricket team which represents Mumbai in Indian domestic cricket. It is governed by Mumbai Cricket Association. Its home ground is Wankhede Stadium of Churchgate.

The team also plays its home matches at Bandra Kurla Complex Ground and Brabourne Stadium. The team comes under the West Zone designation. It was formerly known as the Bombay cricket team, but it changed when the city was officially renamed from Bombay to Mumbai.

Mumbai is the most successful team in the history of Ranji Trophy, India's premier domestic cricket competition, with 41 titles, the most recent being in 2015–16. It also has 14(1 shared) Irani Cup titles to its name, also the most by any team. Mumbai has produced some of the greatest Indian cricketers of all time such as Sachin Tendulkar, Sunil Gavaskar, Rohit Sharma, Vijay Merchant, Ajinkya Rahane, Polly Umrigar, and Dilip Vengsarkar.

History 

It has played in 44 of the 67 Ranji finals as of 2014 winning 40.

Bombay won the first-ever Ranji Trophy competition in 1934–35 with Vijay Merchant starring in the final against Northern India. The title was retained the following season with a victory over Madras in the final. Bombay quickly showed themselves to be one of the strongest teams in the competition with 7 victories in the first 20 seasons of the Ranji Trophy. When playing Maharashtra in a semi-final of the 1948–49 season at Pune, Mumbai became the first and only team in first-class history to score over 600 runs in both innings of the same match – 651 and 714.

However, it was after this period that their dominance was at its zenith. From 1955–56 to 1976–77, Bombay won 20 out of 22 titles including 15 in a row from 1958–59 to 1972–73. Bombay continued to regularly reach the Ranji Trophy final up to the mid-1980s.

The latter half of the 1980s was Bombay's least successful period with no final appearances in 5 consecutive seasons. However, they were able to regain some of their former glory from the 1990s onwards winning an additional 6 Ranji Trophies from 1993–94 to 2003–04 under the new name of Mumbai.

In 2006–07, Mumbai won their 37th Ranji Trophy with victory over Bengal in the final at Wankhede Stadium. This win was particularly memorable as the team had recovered from the setbacks of losing their first three games and is reduced to 0/5 in the semi-final against Baroda.

Mumbai's dominance of the Ranji Trophy has led to many consecutive appearances in the Irani Trophy with much success including 15 wins. However, they have failed to beat the Rest of the India team since 1998.

Statistics and Honours
 Ranji Trophy
 Winners (41): 1934–35, 1935–36, 1941–42, 1944–45, 1948–49, 1951–52, 1953–54, 1955–56, 1956–57, 1958–59, 1959–60, 1960–61, 1961–62, 1962–63, 1963–64, 1964–65, 1965–66, 1966–67, 1967–68, 1968–69, 1969–70, 1970–71, 1971–72, 1972–73, 1974–75, 1975–76, 1976–77, 1980–81, 1983–84, 1984–85, 1993–94, 1994–95, 1996–97, 1999–00, 2002–03, 2003–04, 2006–07, 2008–09, 2009–10, 2012–13, 2015–16
 Runners-up (5): 1947–48, 1979–80, 1982–83, 1990–91, 2016–17

Irani Cup (14) – 1959-60, 1962-63, 1963-64, 1967-68, 1969-70, 1970-71, 1972-73, 1975-76, 1976-77, 1981-82, 1985-86, 1994-95, 1995-96, 1997-98; (1 shared) – 1965-66

Wills Trophy 
 Winners (8): 1981-82, 1982-83, 1985-86, 1990-91, 1990-91, 1994-95, 1996-97, 1997-98; (1 shared) – 1978-79

Vijay Hazare Trophy 
 Winners (4): 2003-04, 2006-07, 2018-19, 2020-21
 Runners-up (1): 2011-12

Syed Mushtaq Ali Trophy (1) 
 Winners (1): 2022-23

Notable players 

The team is known for its batting and spin bowling and has produced many of the Indian cricket team's top batsmen over the years. Players who have appeared in the national team include:

 Aavishkar Salvi
 Abey Kuruvilla
 Abhishek Nayar
 Ajinkya Rahane
 Ajit Agarkar
 Ajit Pai
 Ajit Wadekar
 Amol Muzumdar
 Arvind Apte
 Ashok Mankad
 Baloo Gupte
 Balwinder Sandhu
 Bapu Nadkarni
 Chandrakant Pandit
 Chandrakant Patankar
 Chandu Borde
 Dattaram Hindlekar
 Dattu Phadkar
 Dilip Sardesai
 Dilip Vengsarkar
 Dhawal Kulkarni
 Eknath Solkar
 Farokh Engineer
 Ghulam Parkar
 Gulabrai Ramchand
 Gundibail Sunderam
 Jatin Paranjpe
 Karsan Ghavri
 KC Ibrahim
 Keki Tarapore
 Khandu Rangnekar
 Khershed Meherhomji
 Lalchand Rajput
 Laxmidas Jai
 Madhav Apte
 Madhav Mantri
 Manohar Hardikar
 Naren Tamhane
 Nilesh Kulkarni
 Paras Mhambrey
 Phiroze Palia
 Polly Umrigar
 Pravin Amre
 Prithvi Shaw
 Raju Kulkarni
 Ramakant Desai
 Ramesh Powar
 Ramnath Kenny
 Ramnath Parkar
 Ravi Shastri
 Rohit Sharma
 Rusi Modi
 Rustomji Jamshedji
 Sachin Tendulkar
 Sadu Shinde
 Sairaj Bahutule
 Salil Ankola
 Sameer Dighe
 Sandeep Patil
 Sanjay Manjrekar
 Shardul Thakur
 Shivam Dube
 Shreyas Iyer
 Sorabji Colah
 Subhash Gupte
 Sudhir Naik
 Sunil Gavaskar
 Suru Nayak
 Suryakumar Yadav
 Umesh Kulkarni
 Vijay Manjrekar
 Vijay Merchant
 Vinod Kambli
 Wasim Jaffer
 Zaheer Khan

Current squad 
Players with international caps are listed in bold.

Updated as on 24 January 2023

Support staff

Coach and support staff in Mumbai cricket team are shown below:
 Coach- Amol Muzumdar
 Team manager – Arman Mallick
 Video analyst – Ganesh Tyagi
 Trainer  – Amogh Pandit
 Assistant coach – Wilkin Mota
 Physio – Abhishek Sawant
 Masseur – Sunil Rajguru
 Selectors - 
1. Salil Ankola – Chairman
2. Sanjay Patil
3. Ravindra Thaker
4. Zulfiqar Parkar
5. Ravi Kulkarni

Notes

References

Indian first-class cricket teams
Cricket
Cricket in Maharashtra
Cricket clubs established in 1865
1865 establishments in India